Rabbit Creek is one of several streams that flow through the city of Anchorage, Alaska. It runs for 15 miles from the Chugach Mountains to Turnagain Arm. Before English-speaking settlers arrived in Anchorage, the Dena'ina called the creek "Ggeh Betnu."

Course
Rabbit Lake is a popular hiking destination and can be reached via either the Rabbit Lake Trail or the neighboring McHugh Creek drainage. The creek then descends from the Chugach Mountains and flows west through residential areas and green spaces including Griffin Park. Near its mouth at Potter Marsh it receives a tributary from Little Rabbit Creek, which drains the hillside just south of the main creek channel. It then flows southwest under the Seward Highway and empties into Turnagain Arm of Cook Inlet.

Recreation
A well-traversed 4.4-mile hiking trail begins at Canyon Road and follows the upper stretch of Rabbit Creek through the Chugach Mountains to Rabbit Lake.

See also
List of rivers of Alaska

References

Rivers of Anchorage, Alaska
Rivers of Alaska